Joe McCarthy (born 26 March 2001) is an Irish rugby union player, currently playing for United Rugby Championship and European Rugby Champions Cup side Leinster. His preferred position is lock.

Leinster
McCarthy was named in the Leinster Rugby academy for the 2021–22 season. He made his debut in Round 11 of the 2021–22 United Rugby Championship against .

Ireland
In June 2022, he was included in the Ireland squad for the 2022 tour of New Zealand. He made his international debut off the bench in the 60th minute of a 13–10 win over Australia.

References

External links

2001 births
Living people
Sportspeople from Manhattan
Irish rugby union players
Leinster Rugby players
Rugby union locks
Ireland international rugby union players